Moreno Vušković (born 21 April 2003) is a Croatian footballer currently playing as a forward for Kustošija.

Club career
Vušković moved to Dinamo Zagreb in August 2020, having represented NK Solin and Inter Zaprešić in the 2. HNL and 1. HNL, respectfully. After two years, he moved to Slovenia to sign for Radomlje in February 2022.

In February 2023, Vušković joined Kustošija from CSKA Sofia.

International career
Vušković has represented Croatia at youth international level.

Personal life
Hailing from a footballing family, Vušković's father, Ronald, is a semi-professional footballer in Croatia, while his grandfather, Mario, played for the youth teams of Hajduk Split during the tenure of Tomislav Ivić, and went on to forge a footballing career in the Netherlands. His great-grandfather, Marko, also played for Hajduk Split during World War II, and went on to work as a club executive. His brother, Vito, currently plays for Rudeš.

In addition to this, his uncle, Danijel, formerly played for Hajduk Split, and now serves as a coach for the youth team, while cousins Mario and Luka also played for Hajduk Split, with Mario going on to Hamburger SV in Germany.

Career statistics

Club

Notes

References

2003 births
Living people
Footballers from Split, Croatia
Association football forwards
Croatian footballers
Croatia youth international footballers
First Football League (Croatia) players
Croatian Football League players
Second Professional Football League (Bulgaria) players
NK Solin players
NK Inter Zaprešić players
GNK Dinamo Zagreb players
NK Radomlje players
PFC CSKA Sofia players
PFC Litex Lovech players
NK Kustošija players
Croatian expatriate footballers
Croatian expatriate sportspeople in Slovenia
Expatriate footballers in Slovenia
Croatian expatriate sportspeople in Bulgaria
Expatriate footballers in Bulgaria